The Shanghai Academy of Social Sciences (SASS) was founded in 1958 and is China's oldest think tank for the humanities and social sciences. It is the country's second largest such institution, after the Chinese Academy of Social Sciences (CASS) in Beijing. Besides funds from the municipal government of Shanghai, the academy draws financial support from non-governmental sources at home and abroad.

SASS has signed over 60 cooperative agreements with international partners. Every year it hosts over 1,000 foreign visitors and hundreds of international conferences, lectures and seminars, as is represented by the bi-annual World Forum on China Studies, sponsored by the State Council Information Office and the Shanghai Municipal People's Government.

Controversy 
The Federal Bureau of Investigation (FBI) has stated that SASS frequently provides cover to intelligence operatives of the Ministry of State Security (MSS). The FBI adds that the MSS "uses SASS employees as spotters and assessors."

See also

 Center of Jewish Studies Shanghai
 Chinese Academy of Social Science
 Chinese Academy of Science
 Scientific publishing in China

References

External links
 

Research institutes in China
Education in Shanghai
Organizations established in 1958
1958 establishments in China
Science and technology in the People's Republic of China
Organizations based in Shanghai